The Houtribdijk is a dam in the Netherlands, built between 1963 and 1975 as part of the Zuiderzee Works, which connects the cities of Lelystad and Enkhuizen. On the west side of the dike is the Markermeer and on the east is the IJsselmeer. The 27-kilometer-long dike was intended for the Markerwaard, but this polder is now unlikely to be constructed.

Although called a dike (withholding water from land area), the Houtribdijk is actually a dam (separating water bodies).

Parts of the dike are known as the Markerwaarddijk and the Lelydijk. It is also frequently called the "Enkhuizen–Lelystad dike" in traffic announcements, as if it had no official name.

The road that runs on the dike is the N302 and is used by 8,500 vehicles per day with a speed limit of 100 km/h. The road also features a biking path alongside the N302 on the northeastern side. Marine traffic can cross the dike at either the locks or the naviduct at Enkhuizen. Alternatively, there is a lock system at Lelystad.

Trintelhaven is also the site of a restaurant and an AM broadcasting station, which used to operate on 1395 kHz with 20 kW. It uses as antenna a 54-meters-tall free-standing grounded-lattice steel mast, which was built in 1999. The mast carries a wire antenna, which runs up the tower and is fixed to a horizontal cross on the top of the tower.

External links 
 http://the-antenna-site.eu/netherlands-lelystad-trintelhaven.html
 The Houtribdijk on Youtube

Roads in the Netherlands
Dams in the Netherlands
Causeways in Europe
Buildings and structures in Enkhuizen
Buildings and structures in Lelystad
Transport in Flevoland
Transport in North Holland
Zuiderzee Works